CGD may refer to:

Organizations
Caixa Geral de Depósitos, Portuguese bank
Compagnia Generale del Disco, Italian record label
Center for Global Development, a Washington-based think-tank

Other
IATA code for Changde Taohuayuan Airport, China
Chronic granulomatous disease, a condition of the immune system
Constitutional growth delay, a condition inhibiting children's growth
Certified GeoExchange Designer -- see IGSHPA and Association of Energy Engineers
Commercial Grade Dedication
NetBSD Cryptographic Device Driver